Herbert Felix Jolowicz (16 July 1890 – 19 December 1954) was a British legal scholar. A scholar of Roman law, he was Regius Professor of Civil Law at the University of Oxford from 1948 to 1954.

His sister was the legal scholar Marguerite Wolff.

References

Further reading 

 
 

1890 births
1954 deaths
Regius Professors of Civil Law (University of Oxford)
Scholars of Roman law
British Army personnel of World War I
British Army personnel of World War II
Intelligence Corps officers
Bedfordshire and Hertfordshire Regiment officers
People educated at St Paul's School, London
Alumni of Trinity College, Cambridge
Members of the Inner Temple
English barristers
British Jews
Academics of University College London